Protasiv Yar is a railway stop that is located in Kyiv, Ukraine. It is part of the Kyiv Directorate of (Southwestern Railways).

The stop was created in 1954 during the electrification of a segment Kyiv-Pasazhyrsky - Brovary.

Among the services provided at the station is only embarkment and disembarkment of passengers for commuter and regional lines. There is no loading and unloading of luggage.

Railway stations in Kyiv
Southwestern Railways stations
Railway stations opened in 1954
1954 establishments in Ukraine